The Galley Islands are an archipelago off the northeast coast of Antigua.

Geography 
At the northeastern extremity of North Sound, north of Guiana Island, are the Galley Islands, which includes Great Bird Island, Hells Gate Island, Red Head Island, Exchange Island, Rabbit Island, and Lobster Island. The majority of the Galley Islands are centered on Great Bird Island, the largest island and one that is located the farthest from the coast. A series of reef crowns run southwest into the North Sound from the islands. The Galley Islands are a part of Saint Peter.

The islands have been a component of the North East Marine Management Area since 2006. The smaller islands of Antigua were integrated as an important area for coastal birds in 2007 and designated as an Offshore Islands Important Bird Area (AG006).

References 

Geography of Antigua and Barbuda